Agonum ericeti is a species of ground beetle in the Platyninae subfamily that can be found in all Europe except for Spain and Portugal.

Description
The upper body is usually one colour, bronze or copper-red, rarely black and bronze. Prothorax narrowed in the direction backward more than forward.

Ecology
The species lives in sphagnum bogs.

References

ericeti
Beetles of Europe
Beetles described in 1809